The Matchless G9 is a British motorcycle made by Associated Motorcycles at the former Matchless works in Plumstead, London. The G9 was finally discontinued in 1961.

Development
The Matchless G9 and corresponding AJS Model 20 were launched at the post war Earls Court motorcycle show in late 1948. Initially for export to the US, it was not until the late summer of 1949 that the first examples reached the home market. The styling was modern and the dual seat, megaphone silencers and bright chrome finish justified the name of Super Clubman for the matchless and Spring Twin for the AJS. The rest of the cycle parts were standard AMC, with the engine being housed in a pivoted fork frame with telescopic front forks. The basic design changed little over the course of the next few years, the most significant change being made in 1952 when a new Burman gearbox was adopted.

In 1951, the rear suspension was upgraded to the Jampot unit, derided for its shape in the 28 September issue of the Motor Cycle magazine. In the same year minor changes included a new Lucas horn-push on the handlebar and a medallion badge in place of the previously used transfer. Front fork shuttle damping was also replaced with rod and damper-type.

Progressively developed, the G9 was finally discontinued in 1961.

References

External links
 Matchless G9 video
 Motor Cycling Matchless G9 cover

G9
Motorcycles introduced in 1948